Ibrahim Kabie (born 29 August 1984) is a Saudi Arabian footballer who plays as a defender.

References

External links
 

1984 births
Living people
Saudi Arabian footballers
Association football defenders
Al-Watani Club players
Al-Qadsiah FC players
Najran SC players
Al-Kawkab FC players
Al-Suqoor FC players
Saudi Professional League players
Saudi First Division League players
Saudi Second Division players